General Engelhardt may refer to:

Alexander Bogdanovich Engelhardt (1795–1859), Imperial Russian Army lieutenant general
Christoph von Engelhardt (1762–1831), Baltic German general
Grigori Engelhardt (1759–1834), Russian Army major general
Lothar Engelhardt (1939–2010), German National People's Army major general
Nikolai Engelhardt (1799–1856), Russian Army lieutenant general
Valerian Engelhardt (1798–1856), Russian Army lieutenant general

See also
Adriaan Engelvaart (1812–1893), Royal Netherlands Army general